Dance USA Dance, also known as DUD, is an international dance competition reality TV show that airs on Zee TV USA. It is created and produced by 5678 Media Group. In this dance competition, the teams are challenged to perform different styles of dance to South Asian or Bollywood music. The various dance forms featured are freestyle, hip-hop, Bollywood fusion, jazz, salsa, breaking, popping & locking, Bharatanatyam and Kathak.

The Dance USA Dance competition was premiered on April 17, 2017 with Bollywood choreographer Master Saroj Khan being the master judge of the first season. The second season of the show is to be telecasted in October 2018 with international celebrities , Nakul Dev Mahajan and Lauren Gottlieb as the Season 2 grand jury.

The show follows a format where a dance team is required to submit dance videos online; the selected teams are invited for auditions closest to their home city. Two teams are then selected from each city that move to the semi-finale where they compete against other city winners. This is the competition's main phase which culminates into a grand finale with one champion.

Format 
Registration for this competition requires dance teams to submit introduction videos of their dance routines through DUD's social media partner - BollyShake. The selected teams are invited to register and participate at the auditions closest to their home city. The contestants are judged in two categories: Junior – 6 to 12 years and Senior – 13+ years. At each audition, the qualifying round jury gives their feedback and scores on the performance and finally selects two teams to move to the Semi-Finale. The jury also reserves the right to pick wild-card entries.

The regional winners then compete in the semi-finals and during the grand finale, emerging semi-finalists will be challenged to put forth their best show to win the title of “Dance USA Dance” Season 2 champion. All contestants in the final event are judged on criteria of routine (25%), synchronization (25%), choreography (20%), presentation (20%), and voting by broadcast viewing audience (10%).

Season details

Season 1 
For the first season, regional competitions were held at six cities namely San Francisco, Washington DC, Orlando, Atlanta, Seattle, and New York. The Season 1 finale was organized at Ritz Performing arts center in Elizabeth, NJ. The winning teams of the finale were awarded a cash prize, trophies and a bundle prize from various sponsors. Manish Jagwani was the choreographer for all teams.

Host 
 Sunny Moza

Judges 
 Saroj Khan
 Ryan Daniel Beck
 Asha Gopal
 David Guggino

Finalists 
 Exodus Artistry was the winner
 Kriya Dance Academy (Adult) was the 1st runner up
 Arya Dance Academy (Youth) was the 2nd runner up

Season 2 
For this season, the regional rounds were held at 15 cities including Atlanta, Orlando, Washington DC, New Jersey, New York, Cincinnati, Dallas, San Jose, and Seattle. Dance USA Dance partnered with McDonald's for the second season and accepted global video entries from India, Pakistan, Turkey, Canada and Belarus. Final 12 teams were competing for a prize money of $15,000.

Host 
Sarish Khan

Judges 
Regional rounds
 Jesse Lee Santos
 Shivani & Chaya
 Greg Chapkis

 Finale Judges
 Nakul Dev Mahajan
 Lauren Gottlieb
 Matt Steffanina

Winners
Gurus Of Dance Senior (1st Place)
PCIPA Rockstars Junior (1st Place)

References

External links 
 
 

Zee TV original programming
Dance competition television shows